Escoboza is a Spanish surname. Notable people with the surname include:

Alonso Escoboza (born 1993), Mexican footballer
Jesús Alfonso Huerta Escoboza (1966−2020), Mexican professional wrestler, known professionally as "La Parka (II)"

See also
Escobosa de Almazán, municipality located in the province of Soria, Spain

Spanish-language surnames